The Rapid River is a river in northern Saskatchewan, Canada. It is part of the Mackenzie River drainage basin.

Hydrology
The river continues to Parker Lake at an elevation of  where it takes in the left tributary Arnold River. The river's waters flow via the Cree River, the Fond du Lac River and the Mackenzie River to the Arctic Ocean.

See also
List of rivers of Saskatchewan

References

Rivers of Saskatchewan